Roehrig Motorsports is a former auto racing team that competed part-time in the NASCAR Winston Cup and full-time in the Craftsman Truck Series from 1995 to 1999. It was owned by longtime automotive engineer Kurt Roehrig and his wife Carmela. In 1999 and 2000, the team entered a partnership with track star Jackie Joyner-Kersee and her husband to field a Winston Cup team in a venture called Joyner-Kersee-Roehrig Motorsports.

History

Winston Cup Series 
Roehrig Motorsports entered Winston Cup competition at the inaugural 1998 Las Vegas 400, entering the #19 Yellow Freight Ford Taurus with Tony Raines driving, but did not qualify. The combination made two more attempts at California Speedway and Michigan International Speedway but also failed to qualify for both events. Roehrig Motorsports made its official race debut at the Save Mart/Kragen 350 at Sears Point Raceway with team shop foreman Tom Hubert driving and Bradford White sponsoring. They qualified tenth but finished forty-first after dropping out with transmission issues after seventy-eight laps. Following this race, Roehrig made two more Cup attempts with Yellow Freight sponsorship, with Robby Gordon at the Brickyard 400 and with Raines at Michigan, but failed to qualify for both events.

Roehrig returned to Cup competition in 1999 at the Las Vegas 400 with Hubert and Bradford White, qualifying fourth but finishing twenty-eighth, five laps down. Their next appearance came at Sonoma, this time fielding a Pontiac Grand Prix for Hubert, starting thirtieth and finishing thirty-third. At the next road course race at the 1999 Frontier @ the Glen, the team leased the #19 to Paul Gentilozzi after he wrecked the #92 Homelink Ford he originally planned to enter, but the effort did not qualify. Roehrig made his final Cup attempt of 1999 with Hubert the following week but Michigan, but failed to qualify.

Late in 1999, Roehrig formed a partnership with trainer Bob Kersee and his wife Jackie Joyner-Kersee to field a Winston Cup team for the 2000 season. The effort, known as Joyner-Kersee-Roehrig Motorsports, made its only appearance at the 2000 Bud Shootout, running the #34 Chevrolet with David Green driving and Kendall Motor Oil and Sunoco sponsoring, finishing twelfth. Green and the team were entered in the 2000 Daytona 500 but withdrew their entry after time trials, and after the team was unable to find sponsorship, did not make an appearance in Winston Cup again.

Craftsman Truck Series

Truck #18 History 
Roehrig Motorsports debuted in the inaugural Craftsman Truck Series race, the 1995 Copper World Classic. Johnny Benson qualified the #18 Hella Lights/Performance Friction Chevrolet C/K fourth and finished tenth. Benson made six more starts that season with Performance Friction sponsorship, his best being a second at Indianapolis Raceway Park. Wally Dallenbach Jr. and Davy Jones made starts at Sonoma and Heartland Park Topeka, respectively, with Dallenbach finishing second in his lone start. Roehrig made another attempt at a part-time schedule with the #18 in 1996, starting with Benson who brought along Pennzoil sponsorship and finished in the top ten in all four of his starts, winning one pole. Along with Benson, David Green, Steve Park, and Robby Gordon all made a series of one-off starts in the truck, with Park and Gordon each earning a top-ten finish.

In 1997. Roehrig attempted a full-time schedule in the #18 with Michael Dokken driving with sponsorship from Dana Corporation. Despite a pole position early in the season and two top-five finishes, Dokken struggled with consistency and was released midway through the season. He was replaced with a rotation of replacement drivers including Tom Hubert, Kevin Cywniski, Ted Christopher, and Jerry Marquis along with Benson and Gordon. Hubert recorded the highest finish of the year with a 2nd place finish at Sonoma Raceway. The #18 team did not return for 1998.

Truck #19 History 
Roehrig Motorsports debuted the #19 Dodge Ram in 1997 with rookie Tony Raines and sponsorship from Pennzoil. After failing to qualify for two of the first four races, Raines won his first career race at I-70 Speedway and had seven top-ten finishes, ending the season fifteenth in the championship standings and third in the Rookie of the Year competition. The team switched to Ford in 1998, and Raines won three additional races and finished a career-best fifth in points. Following the team's decision to focus on its Winston Cup operation, the Craftsman Truck team closed its doors.

References 

Companies based in North Carolina
Defunct NASCAR teams
Auto racing teams established in 1995
Auto racing teams disestablished in 1999